The , commonly shortened to PC-88, are a brand of Zilog Z80-based 8-bit home computers released by Nippon Electric Company (NEC) in 1981 and primarily sold in Japan.

The PC-8800 series sold extremely well and became one of the four major Japanese home computers of the 1980s, along with the Fujitsu FM-7, Sharp X1 and the MSX computers. It was later eclipsed by NEC's 16-bit PC-9800 series, although it still maintained strong sales up until the early 90s.

NEC's American subsidiary, NEC Home Electronics (USA), marketed variations of the PC-8800 in the United States and Canada.

History
Nippon Electric's Microcomputer Sales Section of the Electronic Device Sales Division launched the PC-8001 in September 1979, and by 1981 it consisted of 40% of the Japanese personal computer market. In April 1981, Nippon Electric decided to expand personal computer lines into three groups: New Nippon Electric, Information Processing Group and Electronic Devices Group, with each specializing in a particular series. The Microcomputer Sales Section was reformed to the Microcomputer and Application Division in June 1980, and was renamed to the Personal Computer Division in April 1981. At that time, Japanese personal computers were mostly used by hobbyists. The division introduced the PC-8801 in November 1981 and intended to expand the personal computer market into the business world.

The PC-8801 was capable of displaying Kanji characters via an optional Kanji ROM board. NEC themselves released  which was a rebranded version of Yukara, but it was not a success. In addition to office software, companies like Enix and Koei released many popular games for the system, establishing the PC-8801 as a strong gaming platform. By November 1983, the PC-8801 had shipped 170,000 units. The PC-8801's direct successor, the PC-8801mkII, came with a JIS level 1 kanji font ROM, a smaller case and keyboard, and, in the models 20 and 30, one or two internal 5-inch 2D floppy disk drives. This set of PC-8800 computers sold more units than the PC-9800 series at that time.

By December 1983, NEC had multiple personal computer lines coming out from different divisions. NEC's Information Processing group had the PC-9800 series, and NEC Home Electronics had the PC-6000 series. To avoid competing with itself, NEC decided to consolidate their personal computer business into two divisions; the NEC Home Electronics division dealt with the 8-bit home computer line, and the Information Processing group dealt with the 16-bit personal computer line. The Electronic Device Sales division spun off personal computer business into NEC Home Electronics.

In March 1985, NEC Home Electronics introduced the PC-8801mkIISR, which had improved graphics and sound capabilities. A cost reduced version, the PC-8801mkIIFR, shipped 60,000 units for half a year. Although the PC-9801VM shipments surpassed it, the PC-8800 series was still popular as a Japanese PC game platform until the early 1990s.

Hardware

Graphics 
Throughout the lifetime of the PC-8800, there were four different graphics modes. They are as follows:

N mode: PC-8000 series compatible graphic mode
V1 mode: 640 × 200 8 colors, 640 × 400 2 colors
V2 mode:  640 × 200 8 out of 512 colors, 640 × 400 2 out of 512 colors
V3 mode:  640 × 200: 65536 colors, 640 × 400: 256 out of 65536 colors, 320 × 200: 65536 colors, 320 ×  400: 64 out of 65536 colors

No entry in the PC-8800 series was capable of displaying all four modes.

Sound 
The early computers in the PC-8800 series use a simple internal speaker, like the Apple II and IBM PC, capable of generating beeps and clicks. Later models added FM-synthesis chips for much more elaborate audio.

Software
Companies that produced exclusive software for the NEC PC-8801 included Enix, Square, Sega, Nihon Falcom, Bandai, HAL Laboratory, ASCII, Pony Canyon, Technology and Entertainment Software, Wolf Team, Dempa, Champion Soft, Starcraft, Micro Cabin, PSK, and Bothtec. Certain games produced for the PC-8801 had a shared release with the MSX, such as those produced by Game Arts, ELF Corporation, and Konami. Many popular series first appeared on the NEC PC-8801, including Snatcher, Thexder, Dragon Slayer, RPG Maker, Sokoban, and Ys.

Nintendo licensed Hudson Soft to port some of Nintendo's Family Computer games for the platform, including Excitebike, Balloon Fight, Tennis, Golf, and Ice Climber, as well as new editions of Mario Bros. called Mario Bros. Special and Punch Ball Mario Bros., a semi-sequel to Donkey Kong 3 titled Donkey Kong 3: Dai Gyakushū.

The computer also had its own BASIC dialect, N88-BASIC.

Model list

References

Further reading 
  (A floppy-disk controller supporting 2TD (triple density) diskettes)

External links
 (Translated)
System Information emulation site for retro Japanese computers
OLD-COMPUTERS.COM: The Museum: NEC PC-8801
NEC PC-8801 info page popular games, tags and developers at uvlist.net
NEC PC-8801 MK II commercial on YouTube
NEC PC-8801MA FA commercial on YouTube
A list of downloadable PC88 emulators

NEC personal computers
Computer-related introductions in 1981
Home computers
Z80-based home computers